The White Noise was an American punk rock band from Dallas, Texas, later based in Los Angeles, California. Formed in 2009 under the name Set the Sun by guitarist and vocalist David Southern and drummer Alex Summers, the band has gone through many lineup changes. In 2013, Southern was the sole founding member and recruited vocalist Shawn Walker and guitarist Josh "KJ" Strock to form what would eventually become The White Noise.

History

2009–2011: Formative Years, Set the Sun and Desolate
Set The Sun was formed in 2009 by David Southern and Alex Summers at the ages of 17 in Dallas, Texas. Southern and Summers began playing music together before enlisting the help of Nate Anderson, Arturo Pina, Dakota Price and Brandon Daniels in early 2010. The band's style was a mix of post-hardcore, metalcore and heavy metal incorporating unclean Vocals from Anderson and clean vocals from Southern. Set The Sun entered the studio in late 2010 before releasing their Debut EP Set The Sun in early 2011. Set The Sun continued this style into their second release Desolate recorded in early 2011 and released in late 2011.

2012–2014: Relocation and name change

In early 2012, Set The Sun release two singles days apart, the first "Armagetition" continuing their metalcore style and the second "Mishaps" being an acoustic ballad using only Southern's clean Vocals.  Additionally, the band played Vans Warped tour in 2012 and 2013 and South by So What?! in 2013.  However, after frequent touring the band began to experience person problems, leading to the departure of Anderson, Pina, Daniels and Summers and Southern's being left as the sole found member. Although, Price is currently playing for Hollowealth.

Instead of giving up Southern decided to recruit a whole new band of musicians, gaining the assistance of ex-Down to Friend unclean vocalist and keyboard player Shawn Walker (who had previously replaced Price as bassist, however moved to clean vocals after Anderson's departure), Josh "KJ" Strock, ex-The Scarlet Letter drummer Landon Jett and bassist Kendrick Nicholson who met through the recording studio that Strock was working at the time and began working on new material. Then after the release of many singles (including The Temptress, Expectations, The Prince, Father Said and The Ghost of John Stokedton ), which were intended to be released as the band's debut album, the members began to feel their following material was so different from that of their first two EPs, they decided on a name change to The White Noise. Eventually leading to the departure of Jett (going on to start Clover The Girl) and Nicholson (who went on to join Even Cameras Lie and Blindwish) and the recruitment of ex-Crown the Empire guitar tech Bailey Crego and ex-Even Cameras Lie and Afterzoo drummer Tommy West. The change in musical style, partially being to do with how the members realized that they, themselves, did not enjoy listening to metalcore, and were in fact only playing the style because everybody else in their scene was as well, leading to their relocation to Los Angeles.

In 2014, Southern guested on post-hardcore band Coronet's debut EP, The Greater of Two Fires.

2015-2018: Aren't You Glad EP, AM/PM and Final Show
In early 2015, the newly christened band The White Noise signed to Fearless Records before releasing the single and music video Bloom, on August 13. This style was then continued on to their next single Red Eye Lids released on October 21, and onto the release of their debut EP (under their new alias) Aren't You Glad? on February 27, 2016 coinciding with the release of the EPs third music video, Picture Day

The White Noise released their debut full-length album AM/PM on June 23, 2017.

In 2018, the ensemble toured with Anti-Flag, Stray from the Path and Sharptooth.

On November 2, 2018 the band announced their final show that occurred on December 15, 2018

Musical style 
The White Noise were a punk rock band. Specifically, they played styles such as post-hardcore, melodic hardcore and hardcore punk. Some of their music includes elements of industrial and ambient music, leading to the categorisations of industrial punk and ambient hardcore. Jeanie Blue of Cryptic Rock described them as blending "the intensity of Hardcore Punk with something that leans more heavily toward Metalcore, and create a sound that is truly unique and full of blistering honesty". While known as Set the Sun, they played metalcore. They have cited musical influences including Rancid, Nine Inch Nails, Underoath, Brand New, Give up the Ghost, Converge, AFI, Jawbreaker and The Used.

Discography

As The White Noise
Albums

EPs

Singles

As Set the Sun
EPs

Singles

Music videos

Members 

Final members
David Southern - clean vocals (2009–2018), rhythm guitar (2009-2016), bass (2016–2018)
Shawn Walker - unclean vocals (2013–2018), clean vocals (2017–2018) bass (2012)
Josh "KJ" Strock - lead guitar (2013–2018)
Bailey Crego - bass (2014–2016), backing vocals (2014–2018), rhythm guitar (2016–2018)
Tommy West - drums (2014–2018)

Past members 
Nate Anderson - unclean vocals (2010–2013)
Arturo Pina - lead guitar (2010–2013)
Dakota Price - bass, clean vocals (2010–2012)
Kendrick Nicholson - bass, backing vocals (2013–2014)
Alex Summers - drums (2009–2013)
Landon Jett - drums (2013–2014)
Brandon Daniels - keyboard (2010–2013)

Timeline

References

External links

American post-hardcore musical groups
Melodic hardcore musical groups from California
Hardcore punk groups from Texas
Musical groups established in 2009
Musical groups disestablished in 2018
Musical groups from Dallas
Metalcore musical groups from Texas